Triumfalnaya Square (former Mayakovsky Square, colloquially Mayakovka) is a public square in the Tverskoy District of the Central Administrative Okrug of Moscow. It is located in the Garden Ring between the Big Garden street, 1st Brest street and 2nd Brest street, 1st Tverskaya Yamskaya street, Armory alley, Building Arc and Tverskaya Street.

References 

Squares in Moscow
Tverskoy District